Ca' d'Zan is a Mediterranean revival mansion in Sarasota, Florida, adjacent to Sarasota Bay. Ca' d'Zan was built in the mid-1920s as the winter residence of the American circus mogul, entrepreneur, and art collector John Ringling and his wife Mable Burton Ringling. The name  means "House of John" in the Venetian language, in Italian it would be "Casa di Giovanni".

Completed in 1926, Ca' d'Zan is a large Mediterranean revival mansion that features an eclectic array of architectural styles including Venetian Gothic, Italian Renaissance, Moorish, and Spanish-inspired elements drawn from different historic periods. The Ringlings had visited Venice, and the house's Venetian Gothic influence is prominently seen in a variety of architectural elements in the decorative program, such as windows with Gothic arches and terra cotta ornament replicating Gothic tracery.

Description and history

The Ringlings first came to Sarasota in 1909 and purchased their waterfront estate in 1911. They wintered at Palms Elysian, an existing house on the property built in 1895, for over a decade before they commissioned the architect Dwight James Baum to design a new winter residence. Construction began in 1924, and the residence was completed in 1926. Soon after its completion, Ca' d'Zan garnered national attention and was called "A Venetian Palace in Florida" when featured in Country Life magazine in 1927. As an expression of revivalist architecture, the array of decorative details that ornament Ca' d'Zan's façade were drawn from different cultural and historic eras in European architecture. As such, the residence is ultimately an imaginative pastiche, uniquely American in character, given its fanciful and creative synthesis of historicizing details.

Ca' d'Zan was meant to impress as a showplace for entertaining. Its first floor consists of principal rooms for entertaining, including a Reception Room, Lounging Room, Breakfast Room, Dining Room, Great Hall and Ballroom. 

The Ringlings commissioned the artist and designer, Willy Pogany (American, born Hungary, 1882–1955), to paint murals for Ca' d'Zan's elaborate interiors. In the Ballroom, 26 canvas paintings are inset into the gilded coffered ceiling that depict "Dancers of the different Nations." This unique ceiling mural reflects the broader trend in high-style American interior design for cosmopolitanism. It was fashionable for wealthy patrons to commission themed decoration to show how cosmopolitan they were. The dancers depicted a range from ancient cultures to a range of modern European folk dances, as well as dances from non-Western cultures. The grandeur of the ballroom ceiling mural reflects the Ringlings' ambitions to impress guests with their knowledge of cultures from around the world; however, a number of the cultures depicted may be viewed as imagined cultural stereotypes today. 

Additionally, Willy Pogany also painted a ceiling mural for the third-floor playroom that depicts scenes from festivities surrounding Venetian Carnivale. This mural includes a fanciful portrait of John and Mable Ringling in festive attire and surrounded by a menagerie of pets, including their dogs and exotic birds. Another artist, Robert Webb Jr., was hired to paint decorative details throughout the home, including painting Italianate ornament on the ceiling in the Dining Room, floral and foliate ornament on the ceiling of the Reception Room, as well as colorful Venetian-inspired ornament on the pecky cypress ceiling in the Great Hall.

The Ringlings purchased many antiques and furnishings at auctions of Gilded Age estates. As such, much of the ornate, revival style decor of Ca' d'Zan may be viewed as an homage to the Gilded Age.

After Mable Ringling died in 1929, John Ringling continued to visit Ca' d'Zan until his death in 1936. Ca' d'Zan was part of John Ringling's bequest to the state of Florida, along with The John & Mable Ringling Museum of Art, which was meant to be a memorial art museum and their philanthropic legacy. However, the estate was in limbo for ten years, as it took much time to settle debts, claims by heirs, and taxes before the State of Florida could take control of the property. Unfortunately, Ca' d'Zan was uninhabited from 1936 to 1946, and the home deteriorated during that time with a lack of interior climate control. Ca' d'Zan opened to the public in 1946 as part of the State Art Museum of Florida.

In 1982, the residence was listed as a contributing property to the Caples'-Ringlings' Estates Historic District, which is on the National Register of Historic Places. Other contributing properties in the district include the Ellen and Ralph Caples residence, The John & Mable Ringling Museum, the Hester Ringling Lancaster Sandford residence, and the Edith and Charles Ringling residence. On April 18, 2012, the AIA's Florida Chapter placed Ca' d'Zan, the Residence of John and Mable Ringling on its list, Florida Architecture: 100 Years. 100 Places.

The 1998 film Great Expectations, directed by Alfonso Cuarón, had portions filmed at Ca' d'Zan, which served as Ms. Dinsmoor's house, Paradiso Perduto.

The polychrome architectural terra cotta that gives Ca' d'Zan its distinctive façade was originally produced by O.W. Ketcham Terra Cotta Works, based in Crum Lynne, PA. Over the years, elements of terra cotta have been reproduced, including sections made by O.W. Ketcham Terra Cotta in the 1950s. The residence is a rare survival and glamorous icon of the Florida Boom Years of the 1920s, for which John Ringling played a major role as a real estate developer in Sarasota. Ca' d'Zan underwent a major restoration from 1996 to 2002 that cost $15 million. The swimming pool was restored in 2018 and is now a shallow reflecting pool. Historic preservation is ongoing to maintain the nearly 100-year-old home.

Gallery

References

External links

 

Historic district contributing properties in Florida
Houses completed in 1926
Houses in Sarasota, Florida
Italianate architecture in Florida
Mediterranean Revival architecture in Florida
National Register of Historic Places in Sarasota County, Florida